Forchhammer may refer to:

Johan Georg Forchhammer (1794–1865), Danish mineralogist and geologist
August Friedrich Wilhelm Forchhammer (1797–1870), Danish jurist and writer
Peter Wilhelm Forchhammer (1801–1894), German classical archaeologist
Johannes Nicolai Georg Forchhammer (1827–1909), Danish philologist
Johannes Georg Forchhammer (1861–1938), Danish physicist and educator
Henni Forchhammer (1863–1955), Danish teacher and women's rights activist
Holger Forchhammer (1866–1946), Danish physician and sports official
Olaf Forchhammer (1881–1964), Danish engineer and pacifist
Bjarne Forchhammer (1903–1970), Danish actor and theatre director
Arne Forchhammer (1934–2005), Danish artist
Lukas Forchhammer (born 1988), Danish singer, songwriter, actor, and frontman of Lukas Graham

Danish-language surnames